The Buck Clarke Sound is the third album by American jazz percussionist Buck Clarke. The album was released in 1963.

Reception 

AllMusic rated the album 2 stars.

Track listing 
All tracks composed by Charles Hampton; except where indicated
 "Rev. Hamp" – 3:03
 "I Can't Get Started" (Ira Gershwin, Vernon Duke) – 3:28
 "Night in Tunisia" (Dizzy Gillespie, Frank Paparelli) – 5:39
 "Couldn't You" – 5:45
 "Desert Sands" (LeRoy Smith) – 3:09
 "Feel" – 6:18
 "One Mint Julep" (Rudolph Toombs) – 2:40
 "Rene" – 4:40

Personnel 

Dwayne Austin – bass
Buck Clarke – bongos, congas
Billy Hart – drums
Charles Hampton – flute, alto saxophone, piano
Jimmy Crawford – piano (tracks: 2, 3, 5)
Lennie Cujé – vibraphone, marimba

Production notes:

Phil Chess - recording supervisor
Wallace Conway - cover design
Burt Burdeen – producer, liner notes

Uses in other media 

The song "Feel" was sampled in a track called "Worldwide" by hip hop duo Pete Rock & CL Smooth from the 1994's The Main Ingredient album.

References 

Buck Clarke albums
1963 albums
Argo Records albums